Boys Will Be Boys is a 1935 British comedy film directed by William Beaudine which stars Will Hay, Gordon Harker and Jimmy Hanley. The film is set at Narkover School, where headmaster Doctor Alec Smart (Will Hay)  becomes involved in the disappearance of a valuable necklace.

The setting is loosely based on the works of Beachcomber, where Narkover is a school specializing in gambling and extortion, and the headmaster is a "Dr. Smart-Allick".

Plot
Alec Smart, who is engaged teaching in a prison, applies for the job of headmaster at a nearby public school to replace the previous headmaster who has been convicted of writing forged cheques and has just been sent to prison. Smart appeals to the Governor to write him a good reference which he pretends to. Afterwards he writes his real recommendation which is very negative about Smart's talents. The trustee who works as the Governor's secretary, Faker Brown, "accidentally" gets the two letters mixed up and delivers the one praising Smart. On the basis of the letter, Lady Dorking, the who runs the Board of Governors appoints Smart to the job. This angers her deputy, Colonel Crableigh, who had favoured promoting his nephew, the Deputy head.

On his arrival at the school, Smart is treated to a boisterous reception by the unruly students led by the Head Boy, Cyril Brown, who is the son of Faker Brown. Narkover proves to be a breeding ground for young criminals, who prefer to spend their time playing cards rather than taking classes. After his initial attempts to stop their games, Smart himself ends up playing cards with the students. He gets off on the wrong foot with Colonel Crableigh but, in spite of Smart's obvious incompetence, Lady Dorking immediately takes a shine to him. Crableigh begins engineering a scheme to have Smart dismissed and replaced by his own nephew.

Soon after his arrival Smart is approached by Faker Brown, just released from prison, who blackmails him into giving a job as a steward at the school. Brown has his eye on the valuable jewels of Lady Dorking, in particular her diamond necklace, which she is due to be wearing on Founders Day which takes place a few days later. It involves a dinner and a rugby match between the school's old boys and the current students, with Smart persuaded to captain the school team.

On Founder's Day, Lady Dorking wears her best jewels. In the Headmaster's study, she is shown some conjuring tricks by Smart. Crableigh places Dorking's necklace in Smart's pocket in an attempt to incriminate him and have him dismissed. However, the necklace is then stolen by Faker who hides it in a decanter. After trying, and failing, to persuade him to give it back Smart takes it and hides it in a Jewellery Box due to be presented to Lady Dorking at the dinner..

Shortly before the presentation, the diamonds are again taken by the Head Boy Cyril Brown who picks the lock. He hides the necklace in a rugby ball, but before he can make off with it, the ball is taken by the referee in the match. Confusion then ensues as during the match, Faker and Cyril Brown try to recover the ball and make off with it while Smart tries to prevent them. Eventually Smart kicks the ball towards some police spectators and unmasks the villains in spite of Crableigh's attempts to have Smart arrested for the theft.

Cast

 Will Hay as Dr Alec Smart
 Gordon Harker as Faker Brown
 Jimmy Hanley as Cyril Brown
 Davy Burnaby as Col. Crableigh
 Norma Varden as Lady Dorking
 Claude Dampier as Theo P. Finch
 Charles Farrell as Louis Brown
 Percy Walsh as Prison governor
 David Raeburn as Superintendent
 Ben Williams as Prisoner (uncredited)

A young Clive Dunn also made an appearance.

Production and reception
His first production for Gainsborough Pictures, the film was a breakthrough role for Will Hay and helped establish him as a film star throughout the British Empire. The role of the bumbling schoolmaster, which he had first developed in his 1920s music hall act, would be reprised in another two of Hay's films, Good Morning, Boys and The Ghost of St. Michael's

Writing for The Spectator, Graham Greene characterized the film as "very amusing", describing Hay's portrayal of Dr. Smart as "competent" and praising Dampier's portrayal of Second Master Finch as the film's "finest performance". The Radio Times Guide to Films gave Boys Will Be Boys three stars out of five, observing that the film contains "the blend of bluster and dishonesty that makes [Hay's] films irresistible".

Influence
This was Hay's first screen outing for his well-established "schoolmaster" music hall routine. Hay had previously appeared in two Pinero adaptations Those Were The Days and Dandy Dick, and a comedy revue show as the incompetent head of a broadcasting service in Radio Parade of 1935. After the success of Boys Will Be Boys, Hay appeared in a number of films in which he played incompetent schoolmasters including Good Morning Boys and the Ghost of St Michaels. Hay has been described as being "surpassed only by Chaplin as an actor who ingeniously found how to translate his music hall performative to film".

Based on this film, an Australian radio show was made called Fourth Form at St Percys, which quickly changed its title to Yes, what! The show features a teacher (Percy Pym) who sounded like Will Hay trying to teach a bunch of unruly children, the worst of who are Greenbottle (who sounded like Moore Marriott) and Bottomley. They never quite manage to get through a lesson through endless interruptions which easily lead the teacher astray which leads to punishments (hitting with a stick) being handed out. The shows were about 12 minutes long and normally began with chimes and; "Good morning boys! Good morning sir" The series lasted from 1935 till 1937 and cost A$10 an episode to make. Over seventy years later, it is still on a number of radio stations in Australia and is currently available on CD with one of the stars talking about the show.

References

Bibliography
 St. Pierre, Paul Matthew. Music Hall Mimesis in British Film, 1895-1960: On the Halls on the Screen. Associated University Press, 2010.

External links
 
 Boys Will Be Boys - digitised sheet music held by Heritage Collections, State Library of Queensland, Australia.

1935 films
1935 comedy films
British comedy films
British black-and-white films
Films set in schools
Gainsborough Pictures films
Films directed by William Beaudine
Films scored by Jack Beaver
1930s English-language films
1930s British films